Kambainallur is a panchayat town in karimangalam taluk of Dharmapuri district in the Indian state of Tamil Nadu.
It also serves as a main source of transport, food, health and education for many villages situated around the Kambainallur .

History
Kambainallore estate is the zamindari feudal estate located on the banks of Thenpennai river in the Harur Taluk of Erstwhile Salem district. During the British Raj, the sub-collector of Tirupattur sub-division, jointly acted as The magistrate of the Kambainallore estate. 

The sprawling estate is totally of 1,500 hectares in 1900. The vast amount of land was handed over to the First Land Reformation scheme under Panagal Raja cabinet in 1930s. The remaining land and properties are still controlled by the extended feudal Mudaliar family of Kambainallore.

Geography
Sanathkumar river

Demographics
 India census, Kambainallur had a population of 12,194. Males constitute 52% of the population and females 48%. Kambainallur has an average literacy rate of 70.69%, lower than the national average of 80.09%: male literacy is 78.28%, and female literacy is 62.77%. In Kambainallur, 13% of the population is under 6 years of age.

Religion
There are several temples, mosque and church in the area.

Transport
Kambainallur is connected with roads and bus services to Dharmapuri, Krishnagiri, Hosur, Bangalore and Harur. The nearest railway stations are Morappur and Dharmapuri. The nearest airport is Salem Airport. Some buses travel via Kambainallur from Harur to Bangalore, Harur to Palacode, Dharmapuri to Tirupattur, Dharmapuri to Chennai.

Railway Stations
 Morappur (13 km)
 Dharmapuri (25 km)

References

Cities and towns in Dharmapuri district